This is a list of arts and science college run and controlled by the State Government of Tamil Nadu in India. Thee colleges are under the control of Directorate of Collegiate Education Chennai.

References

Lists of universities and colleges in Tamil Nadu
Government of Tamil Nadu
Government universities and colleges in India
[[Category:Colleges in Tamil Nadu for woman
]]